An orphanage is a residential institution, total institution or group home, devoted to the care of orphans and children who, for various reasons, cannot be cared for by their biological families. The parents may be deceased, absent, or abusive. There may be substance abuse or mental illness in the biological home, or the parent may simply be unwilling to care for the child. The legal responsibility for the support of abandoned children differs from country to country, and within countries. Government-run orphanages have been phased out in most developed countries during the latter half of the 20th century but continue to operate in many other regions internationally. It is now generally accepted that orphanages are detrimental to the emotional wellbeing of children, and government support goes instead towards supporting the family unit.

A few large international charities continue to fund orphanages, but most are still commonly founded by smaller charities and religious groups. Especially in developing countries, orphanages may prey on vulnerable families at risk of breakdown and actively recruit children to ensure continued funding. Orphanages in developing countries are rarely run by the state. However, not all orphanages that are state-run are less corrupted; the Romanian orphanages, like those in Bucharest, were founded due to the soaring population numbers catalyzed by dictator Nicolae Ceaușescu, who banned abortion and birth control and incentivized procreation in order to increase the Romanian workforce.

Today's residential institutions for children, also described as congregate care, include group homes, residential child care communities, children's homes, refuges, rehabilitation centers, night shelters, and youth treatment centers.

Research
Research from the Bucharest Early Intervention Project (BEIP) is often cited as demonstrating that residential institutions negatively impact the wellbeing of children. The BEIP selected orphanages in Bucharest, Romania that raised abandoned children in socially and emotionally deprived environments in order to study the changes in development of infants and children after they had been placed with specially trained foster families in the local community. This powerful study demonstrated how the loving attention typically provided to children by their parents or caregivers is pivotal for optimal human development, specifically of the brain; adequate nutrition is not enough. Further research of children who were adopted from institutions in Eastern European countries to the US demonstrated that for every 3.5 months that an infant spent in the institution, they lagged behind their peers in growth by 1 month. Further, a meta-analysis of research on the IQs of children in orphanages found lower IQs among the children in many institutions, but this result was not found in the low-income country setting.

Worldwide, residential institutions like orphanages can often be detrimental to the psychological development of affected children. In countries where orphanages are no longer in use, the long-term care of unwarded children by the state has been transitioned to a domestic environment, with an emphasis on replicating a family home. Many of these countries, such as the United States, utilize a system of monetary stipends paid to foster parents to incentivize and subsidize the care of state wards in private homes. A distinction must be made between foster care and adoption, as adoption would remove the child from the care of the state and transfer the legal responsibility for that child's care to the adoptive parent completely and irrevocably, whereas, in the case of foster care, the child would remain a ward of the state with the foster parent acting only as a caregiver.

Most children who live in orphanages are not orphans; four out of five children in orphanages have at least one living parent and most having some extended family. Developing countries and their governments rely on kinship care to aid in the orphan crisis because it is cheaper to financially help extended families in taking in an orphaned child than it is to institutionalize them. Additionally, developing nations are lacking in child welfare and their well-being because of a lack of resources. Research that is being collected in the developing world shows that these countries focus purely on survival indicators instead of a combination of their survival and other positive indicators like a developed nation would do. This speaks to the way that many developed countries treat an orphan crisis, as the only focus is to obtain a way to ensure their survival. In the developed nations orphans can expect to find not only a home but also these countries will try and ensure a secure future as well. Furthermore, orphans in developing nations are seen as a problem that needs to be solved, this also makes them vulnerable to exploitation or neglect. In Pakistan, alternative care for orphans often falls on to extended families and Pakistan society as the government feels puts the burden of caring for orphans on them. Although it is very common for Pakistan citizens to take in orphans because of their culture and religion, only orphans whose parents have died are taken in. This neglects a population of children who need alternative care, either due to abuse, or parents who are unable to care for their child because of poverty, mental, or physical issues.

History

The Romans formed their first orphanages around 400 AD. Jewish law prescribed care for the widow and the orphan, and Athenian law supported all orphans of those killed in military service until the age of eighteen. Plato (Laws, 927) says: "Orphans should be placed under the care of public guardians. Men should have a fear of the loneliness of orphans and of the souls of their departed parents. A man should love the unfortunate orphan of whom he is guardian as if he were his own child. He should be as careful and as diligent in the management of the orphan's property as of his own or even more careful still." The care of orphans was referred to bishops and, during the Middle Ages, to monasteries. As soon as they were old enough, children were often given as apprentices to households to ensure their support and to learn an occupation.

In medieval Europe, care for orphans tended to reside with the Church. The Elizabethan Poor Laws were enacted at the time of the Reformation and placed public responsibility on individual parishes to care for the indigent poor.

Foundling Hospitals

The growth of sentimental philanthropy in the 18th century led to the establishment of the first charitable institutions that would cater to orphans.
The Foundling Hospital was founded in 1741 by the philanthropic sea captain Thomas Coram in London, England, as a children's home for the "education and maintenance of exposed and deserted young children." The first children were admitted into a temporary house located in Hatton Garden. At first, no questions were asked about child or parent, but a distinguishing token was put on each child by the parent.

On reception, children were sent to wet nurses in the countryside, where they stayed until they were about four or five years old. At sixteen, girls were generally apprenticed as servants for four years; at fourteen, boys were apprenticed into a variety of occupations, typically for seven years. There was a small benevolent fund for adults.

In 1756, the House of Commons resolved that all children offered should be received, that local receiving places should be appointed all over the country, and that the funds should be publicly guaranteed. A basket was accordingly hung outside the hospital; the maximum age for admission was raised from two months to twelve, and a flood of children poured in from country workhouses. Parliament soon came to the conclusion that the indiscriminate admission should be discontinued. The hospital adopted a system of receiving children only with considerable sums. This practice was finally stopped in 1801, and it henceforth became a fundamental rule that no money was to be received.

19th century

By the early nineteenth century, the problem of abandoned children in urban areas, especially London, began to reach alarming proportions. The workhouse system, instituted in 1834, although often brutal, was an attempt at the time to house orphans as well as other vulnerable people in society who could not support themselves in exchange for work. Conditions, especially for the women and children, were so bad as to cause an outcry among the social reform–minded middle-class; some of Charles Dickens' most famous novels, including Oliver Twist, highlighted the plight of the vulnerable and the often abusive conditions that were prevalent in the London orphanages.

Clamour for change led to the birth of the orphanage movement. In England, the movement really took off in the mid-19th century although orphanages such as the Orphan Working Home in 1758 and the Bristol Asylum for Poor Orphan Girls in 1795, had been set up earlier. Private orphanages were founded by private benefactors; these often received royal patronage and government oversight. 
Ragged schools, founded by John Pounds and the Lord Shaftesbury were also set up to provide pauper children with basic education.

Orphanages were also set up in the United States from the early 19th century; for example, in 1806, the first private orphanage in New York (the Orphan Asylum Society, now Graham Windham) was co-founded by Elizabeth Schuyler Hamilton, widow of Alexander Hamilton, one of the Founding Fathers of the United States. Under the influence of Charles Loring Brace, foster care became a popular alternative from the mid-19th century. Later, the Social Security Act of 1935 improved conditions by authorizing Aid to Families with Dependent Children as a form of social security.

A very influential philanthropist of the era was Thomas John Barnardo, the founder of the charity Barnardos. Becoming aware of the great numbers of homeless and destitute children adrift in the cities of England and encouraged by the 7th Earl of Shaftesbury and the 1st Earl Cairns, he opened the first of the "Dr. Barnardo’s Homes" in 1870. By his death in 1905, he had established 112 district homes, which searched for and received waifs and strays, to feed, clothe and educate them. The system under which the institution was carried on is broad as follows: the infants and younger girls and boys were chiefly "boarded out" in rural districts; girls above fourteen years of age were sent to the industrial training homes, to be taught useful domestic occupations; boys above seventeen years of age were first tested in labor homes and then placed in employment at home, sent to sea, or emigrated; boys of between thirteen and seventeen years of age were trained for the various trades for which they might be mentally or physically fitted.

Deinstitutionalization
Evidence from a variety of studies supports the vital importance of attachment security and later development of children. Deinstitutionalization of orphanages and children's homes program in the United States began in the 1950s, after a series of scandals involving the coercion of birth parents and abuse of orphans (notably at Georgia Tann's Tennessee Children's Home Society). In Romania, a decree was established that aggressively promoted population growth, banning contraception and abortions for women with fewer than four children, despite the wretched poverty of most families. After Ceausescu was overthrown, he left a society unable and unwilling to take care of its children. Researchers conducted a study to see what the implications of this early childhood neglect were on development. Typically reared Romanian children showed high rates of secure attachment. Whereas the institutionally raised children showed huge rates of disorganized attachment. Many countries accepted the need to de-institutionalize the care of vulnerable children—that is, close down orphanages in favor of foster care and accelerated adoption.

Foster care operates by taking in children from their homes due to the lack of care or abuse of their parents, where orphanages take in children with no parents or children whose parents have dropped them off for a better life, typically due to income. Major charities are increasingly focusing their efforts on the re-integration of orphans in order to keep them with their parents or extended family and communities. Orphanages are no longer common in the European Community, and Romania, in particular, has struggled greatly to reduce the visibility of its children's institutions to meet conditions of its entry into the European Union.

Some have stated it is important to understand the reasons for child abandonment, then set up targeted alternative services to support vulnerable families at risk of separation such as mother and baby units and day care centres.

Comparison to alternatives
Orphanages, especially larger ones, have had some well publicised examples of poor care. In large institutions children, but particularly babies, may not receive enough eye contact, physical contact, and stimulation to promote proper physical, social or cognitive development. In the worst cases, orphanages can be dangerous and unregulated places where children are subject to abuse and neglect.

One significant study, which disputes this, was carried out by Duke University. Their researchers concluded that institutional care in America in the 20th century produced the same health, emotional, intellectual, mental, and physical outcomes as care by relatives, and better than care in the homes of strangers. One explanation for this is the prevalence of permanent temporary foster care. This is the name for a long string of short stays with different foster care families. Permanent temporary foster care is highly disruptive to the child and prevents the child from developing a sense of security or belonging. Placement in the home of a relative maintains and usually improves the child's connection to family members.

Another alternative is group homes which are used for short-term placements. They may be residential treatment centers, and they frequently specialize in a particular population with psychiatric or behavioral problems, e.g., a group home for children and teens with autism, eating disorders, or substance abuse problems or child soldiers undergoing decommissioning.

Criticism

Most of the children living in institutions around the world have a surviving parent or close relative, and they most commonly entered orphanages because of poverty. It is speculated that flush with money, orphanages are increasing and push for children to join even though demographic data show that even the poorest extended families usually take in children whose parents have died. Experts and child advocates maintain that orphanages are expensive and often harm children's development by separating them from their families and that it would be more effective and cheaper to aid close relatives who want to take in the orphans.

Children living in orphanages for prolonged periods get behind in development goals, and have worse mental health. Orphanage children are not included in statistics making it easy to traffic them or abuse them in other ways. There are campaigns to include orphanage children and street children in progress statistics.

Scams
Visitors to developing countries can be taken in by orphanage scams, which can include orphanages set up as a front to get foreigners to pay school fees of orphanage directors' extended families. Alternatively the children whose upkeep is being funded by foreigners may be sent to work, not to school, the exact opposite of what the donor is expecting. The worst even sell children. In Cambodia, from 2005 to 2017, the number of orphanages increased by 75%, with many of these orphanages renting children from poor families for $25/month. Families are promised that their children can get free education and food here, but what really happens is that they are used as props to garner donations. Some are also bought from their parents for very little and passed on to westerners who pay a large fee to adopt them. This also happens in China. In Nepal, orphanages can be used as a way to remove a child from their parents before placing them for adoption overseas, which is equally lucrative to the owners who receive a number of official and unofficial payments and "donations". In other countries, such as Indonesia, orphanages are run as businesses, which will attract donations and make the owners rich; often the conditions orphans are kept in will deliberately be poor to attract more donations.

Worldwide

Europe
The orphanages and institutions remaining in Europe tend to be in Eastern Europe and are generally state-funded.

Albania 
There are estimated to be about 31,000 orphans (0-14 years old) in Albanian orphanages. (2012 statistics) In most cases they were abandoned by their parents. At 14 they are required, by law, to leave their orphanage and live on their own.
There are approximately 10 small orphanages in Albania; each one having only 12-40 children residing there. The larger ones would be state-run.

Bosnia and Herzegovina 
SOS Children's Villages giving support to 240 orphaned children.

Bulgaria 
The Bulgarian government has shown interest in strengthening children's rights.

In 2010, Bulgaria adopted a national strategic plan for the period 2010–2025 to improve the living standards of the country's children. Bulgaria is working hard to get all institutions closed within the next few years and find alternative ways to take care of the children.

"Support is sporadically given to poor families and work during daytime; correspondingly, different kinds of day centers have started up, though the quality of care in these centers is poorly measured and difficult to monitor. A smaller number of children have also been able to be relocated into foster families".

There are 7000 children living in Bulgarian orphanages wrongly classified as orphaned. Only 10 percent of these are orphans, with the rest of the children placed in orphanages for temporary periods when the family is in crisis.

Estonia 
As of 2009, there are 35 different orphanages.

Hungary 
A comprehensive national strategy for strengthening the rights of children was adopted by Parliament in 2007 and will run until 2032.

Child flow to orphanages has been stopped and children are now protected by social services. Violation of children's rights leads to litigation.

Lithuania 
In Lithuania there are 105 institutions. 41 percent of the institutions each have more than 60 children.
Lithuania has the highest number of orphaned children in Northern Europe.

Poland 
Children's rights enjoy relatively strong protection in Poland. Orphaned children are now protected by social services.

Social Workers' opportunities have increased by establishing more foster homes and aggressive family members can now be forced away from home, instead of replacing the child/children.

Moldova
More than 8800 children are being raised in state institutions, but only three percent of them are orphans.

Romania 

The Romanian child welfare system is in the process of being revised and has reduced the flow of infants into orphanages.

According to Baroness Emma Nicholson, in some counties Romania now has "a completely new, world class, state of the art, child health development policy." Dickensian orphanages remain in Romania, but Romania seeks to replace institutions by family care services, as children in need will be protected by social services. As of 2018, there were 17,718 children in old-style residential centers, a significant decrease from about 100,000 in 1990.

Serbia 
There are many state orphanages "where several thousand children are kept and which are still part of an outdated child care system". The conditions for them are bad because the government does not pay enough attention in improving the living standards for disabled children in Serbia's orphanages and medical institutions.

Slovakia 
The committee made recommendations, such as proposals for the adoption of a new "national 14" action plan for children for at least the next five years, and the creation of an independent institution for the protection of child rights.

Sweden 
One of the first orphanages in Sweden was the Stora Barnhuset (1633-1922) in Stockholm, which remained the biggest orphanage in Sweden for centuries.  In 1785, however, a reform by Gustav III of Sweden stipulated that orphans should first and foremost always be placed in foster homes when that was possible.

In Sweden, there are 5,000 children in the care of the state. None of them are currently living in an orphanage, because there is a social service law which requires that the children reside in a family home.

United Kingdom 
During the Victorian era, child abandonment was rampant, and orphanages were set up to reduce infant mortality. Such places were often so full of children that nurses often administered Godfrey's Cordial, a special concoction of opium and treacle, to soothe baby colic.

Orphaned children were placed in either prisons or the poorhouse/workhouse, as there were so few places in orphanages, or else they were left to fend for themselves on the street. Such openings in orphanages as were available could only be obtained by collecting votes for admission, placing them out of reach of poor families.

Known orphanages are:

Sub-Saharan Africa

The majority of African orphanages (especially in Sub-Saharan Africa) appear to be funded by donors, often from Western nations, rather than by domestic governments.

Ethiopia 
"For example, in the Jerusalem Association Children's Home (JACH), only 160 children remain of the 785 who were in JACH's three orphanages." / "Attitudes regarding the institutional care of children have shifted dramatically in recent years in Ethiopia. There appears to be a general recognition by MOLSA and the NGOs with which Pact is working that such care is, at best, a last resort and that serious problems arise with the social reintegration of children who grow up in institutions, and deinstitutionalization through family reunification and independent living are being emphasized."

Ghana 
A 2007 survey sponsored by OAfrica (previously OrphanAid Africa) and carried out by the Department of Social Welfare came up with the figure of 4,800 children in institutional care in 148 orphanages. The government is currently attempting to phase out the use of orphanages in favor of foster care placements and adoption. At least eighty-eight homes have been closed since the passage of the National Plan of Action for Orphans and Vulnerable Children. The website www.ovcghana.org details these reforms.

Kenya 
A 1999 survey of 36,000 orphans found the following number in institutional care: 64 in registered institutions and 164 in unregistered institutions.

Malawi 
There are about 101 orphanages in Malawi. There is a UNICEF/Government driven program on de-institutionalization, but few orphanages are yet involved in the program.

Amitofo Care Centre ("ACC"), founded and directed by Venerable Hui Li from Taiwan since 2004 is a charitable, non-governmental and nonprofit making orphanage organization, which comprises an administration center, children's dormitories, youth dormitories, preparatory school, Yuan Tong Primary and Secondary schools, library, activity center, medical center, religious center, Community Bases Organization (CBO), etc. ACC is founded and directed by Venerable Hui Li with an aspiration and mission to directly rear and care for need and vulnerable children of Africa within the humanitarian and educational umbrella. The main principles of ACC are based on local African culture, Chinese culture, Western culture, and Buddhist philosophy which are delivered to the needy and vulnerable children. This is considered a unique and remarkable characteristic of ACC although it must be stressed that none of the orphans have taken refuge in Buddhism, as we respect their religious freedom and will allow them to choose their own as they enter adulthood.

Rwanda 
Out of 400,000 orphans, 5,000 are living in orphanages. The Government of Rwanda are working with Hope and Homes for Children to close the first institution and develop a model for community-based childcare which can be used across the country and ultimately Africa

Tanzania 
"Currently, there are 52 orphanages in Tanzania caring for about 3,000 orphans and vulnerable children." A world bank document on Tanzania showed it was six times more expensive to institutionalize a child there than to help the family become functional and support the child themselves.

Nigeria 

In Nigeria, a rapid assessment of orphans and vulnerable children conducted in 2004 with UNICEF support revealed that there were about seven million orphans in 2003 and that 800,000 more orphans were added during that same year. Out of this total number, about 1.8  million are orphaned by HIV/AIDS. With the spread of HIV/AIDS, the number of orphans is expected to increase rapidly in the coming years to 8.2  million by 2010.

South Africa 
Since 2000, South Africa does not license orphanages any more but they continue to be set up unregulated and potentially more harmful. Theoretically, the policy supports community-based family homes but this is not always the case. One example is the homes operated by Thokomala.

Zambia 
A 1996 national survey of orphans revealed no evidence of orphanage care. The breakdown of care was as follows:
38% grandparents,
55% extended family,
1% older orphan,
6% non-relative.
Recently a group of students started a fundraising website for an orphanage in Zambia.

Zimbabwe 

There are 39 privately run children's charity homes, or orphanages, in the country, and the government operates eight of its own.
Privately run Orphanages can accommodate an average of 2000 children, though some are very small and located in very remote areas, hence can take in less than 150 children. 
Statistics on the total number of children in orphanages nationwide are unavailable, but caregivers say their facilities were becoming unmanageably overwhelmed almost on a daily basis.
Between 1994 and 1998, the number of orphans in Zimbabwe more than doubled from 200,000 to 543,000, and in five years, the number is expected to reach 900,000. (Unfortunately, there is no room for these children.)

Togo
In Togo, there were an estimated 280,000 orphans under 18 years of age in 2005, 88,000 of them orphaned by AIDS. Ninety-six thousand orphans in Togo attend school.

Sierra Leone 

 Children (0–17 years) orphaned by AIDS, 2005, estimate 31,000
 Children (0–17 years) orphaned due to all causes, 2005, estimate 340,000
 Orphan school attendance ratio, 1999–2005 71,000

Senegal 
 Children (0–17 years) orphaned by AIDS, 2005, estimate 25,000
 Children (0–17 years) orphaned due to all causes, 2005, estimate 560,000
 Orphan school attendance ratio, 1999–2005 74,000

South Asia

Nepal 
There are at least 602 child care homes housing 15,095 children in Nepal "Orphanages have turned into a Nepalese industry there is rampant abuse and a great need for intervention." Many do not require adequate checks of their volunteers, leaving children open to abuse.

Afghanistan 

"At Kabul's two main orphanages, Alauddin and Tahia Maskan, the number of children enrolled has increased almost 80 percent since last January, from 700 to over 1,200 children. Almost half of these come from families who have at least one parent, but who can't support their children." The non-governmental organisation Mahboba's promise assists orphans in contemporary Afghanistan. Nowadays the number of orphanages had changed. There are approximately 19 orphanages only in Kabul.

Bangladesh 
"There are no statistics regarding the actual number of children in welfare institutions in Bangladesh. The Department of Social Services, under the Ministry of Social Welfare, has a major program named Child Welfare and Child Development in order to provide access to food, shelter, basic education, health services and other basic opportunities for hapless children." (The following numbers mention capacity only, not actual numbers of orphans at present.)

9,500 – State institutions
250 – babies in three available "baby homes"
400 – Destitute Children's Rehabilitation Centre
100 – Vocational Training Centre for Orphans and Destitute Children
1,400 -Sixty-five Welfare and Rehabilitation Programmes for Children with Disability

The private welfare institutions are mostly known as orphanages and madrassahs. The authorities of most of these orphanages put more emphasis on religion and religious studies. One example follows:
400 – Approximately – Nawab Sir Salimullah Muslim Orphanage.

Maldives 
Orphans, Children (0–17 years) orphaned due to all causes, 2010, estimate 51.

India 
 
 	
India is in the top 10 and also has a very large number of orphans as well as a destitute child population. Orphanages operated by the state are generally known as juvenile homes. In addition, there is a vast number of privately run orphanages running into thousands spread across the country. These are run by various trusts, religious groups, individual citizens, citizens groups, NGO's, etc.
	 
While some of these places endeavor to place the children for adoption a vast majority just care and educate them till they are of legal majority age and help place them back on their feet. Prominent organizations in this field include BOYS TOWN, SOS children's villages, etc.
	 
There have been scandals especially with regard to adoption. Since government rules restrict funds unless there are a certain number of residents, some orphanages make sure the resident numbers remain high at the cost of adoption.

Pakistan 

According to a UNICEF report in 2016, there are around 4.2 million orphaned children in Pakistan. Pakistan has had sizable economic growth from 1950 to 1999 yet they aren't performing well in multiple social indicators like education and health, and this is mainly due to the corrupt and unstable government. Pakistan heavily relies on the nonprofit sector and zakat to finance social issues such as aid for orphans. Zakat is a financial obligation on Muslims which requires one to donate 2.5% of the family's income to charity, and it is specifically mentioned in the Quran to take care of orphans. With the new use of zakat money from donations to investments it has a lot of potential in benefiting the development as well as the ultimate goal of poverty alleviation. The Pakistan government relies on this public sector on taking care of local issues so that they do not have the burden. Furthermore, only 6 percent of cash revenues are contributed to non-profits in Pakistan, and they are heavily favored by the government because it saves them money as non-profits are taking care of issues such as orphan care.

East and Southeast Asia

Taiwan 
The number of orphanages and orphans drastically dropped from 15 institutions and 2,216 persons in 1971 to 9 institutions and 638 persons by the end of 2001.

Thailand 
There are still a substantial number of NGOs and informal Orphanages in Thailand, particularly in Northern Thailand near the borders of Laos and Myanmar, e.g. around Chiang Rai. Very few of the children in these establishments are orphans, most have living parents. They attract funding from well-meaning tourists. Often protecting the children from trafficking/abuse is cited but the names and photographs of the children are published in marketing material to attract more funding. The reality is that the safest environment for these children is almost always with their parents or in their villages with familial connections where strangers are rarely seen and immediately recognized. A very few of these orphanages, go so far as to abduct or forcibly remove children from their homes, often across the border in Myanmar. The parents in local hill tribes may be encouraged to "buy a place" in the orphanage for vast sums, being told their child will have a better future. Some children's homes claim to always try to repatriate children with their families, but the local managers & director of the homes know of no such procedures or processes.

Vietnam 
There are approximately 2 million highly vulnerable children in Vietnam with an estimated 500,000 orphaned or abandoned children. There are a number of orphanages present in the country including the Vinh Son Montagnard Orphanage, however these are generally privately funded. There are very few government run institutions.

South Korea 
"There are now 17,000 children in public orphanages throughout the country and untold numbers at private institutions."

Japan
Approximately 39,000 children live in orphanages in Japan out of the 45,000 (2018 statistics) who are not able to live with their birth parents. 

However as of 2016, Japanese orphanages are severely underfunded, relying heavily on volunteer work. There are 602 foster homes across Japan, each with 30 to 100 children. A large portion of children in these orphanages are not actually orphans but victims of domestic abuse or neglect.

Cambodia 
As of 2010, 11,945 children lived in 269 residential care facilities in Cambodia. About 44% were placed there by a parent.
However it is estimated that there are 553,000 orphans in the country. Most of these children are cared for by their extended family or community.

China 
There are currently over 600,000 abandoned orphans living in China (some would put the figure as high as 1 million). Of these, 98% have special needs.

Laos 
"It is stated that there are 20,000 orphaned children in Laos." However the figure generally remains unknown as about 30% of children are never registered with the government and remain invisible. In Laos nearly 50 per cent of the population lives below the poverty line and many children are involved in child labor. There are six orphanages that are run by SOS Children's Village that help with this problem.

Middle East and North Africa

Egypt 
"The [Mosques of Charity] orphanage houses about 120 children in Giza, Menoufiya and Qalyubiya."
"We [Dar Al-Iwaa] provide free education and accommodation for over 200 girls and boys."
"Dar Al-Mu'assassa Al-Iwaa'iya (Shelter Association), a government association affiliated with the Ministry of Social Affairs, was established in 1992. It houses about 44 children."
There are also 192 children at The Awlady, 30 at Sayeda Zeinab orphanage, and 300 at My Children Orphanage.

Note: There are about 185 orphanages in Egypt.
The above information was taken from the following articles:
"Other families" by Amany Abdel-Moneim. Al-Ahram Weekly (5/1999).
"Ramadan brings a charity to Egypt's orphans". Shanghai Star (13 December 2001).
"A Child by Any Other Name" by Réhab El-Bakry. Egypt Today (11/2001).

Orphanage Project in Egypt—www.littlestlamb.org

Sudan 
There is still at least one orphanage in Sudan although the conditions there have been reported as very poor.

South Sudan 
The number of orphans is expected to be 5,000 in 2023 in South Sudan. And in 2018, the UN Children Fund (UNICEF) reported that about 15,000 children in South Sudan had become separated from their families or were missing due to conflict.

Bahrain 
The "Royal Charity Organization" is a Bahraini governmental charity organization founded in 2001 by King Hamad ibn Isa Al Khalifah to sponsor all helpless Bahraini orphans and widows. Since then almost 7,000 Bahraini families are granted monthly payments, annual school bags, and a number of university scholarships. Graduation ceremonies, various social and educational activities, and occasional contests are held each year by the organization for the benefit of orphans and widows sponsored by the organization.

Iraq 
UNICEF maintains the same number at present. "While the number of state homes for orphans in the whole of Iraq was 25 in 1990 (serving 1,190 children); both the number of homes and the number of beneficiaries has declined. The quality of services has also declined."

A 1999 study by UNICEF  "recommended the rebuilding of national capacity for the rehabilitation of orphans." The new project "will benefit all the 1,190 children placed in orphanages."

Palestinian Territory 
"In 1999, the number of children living in orphanages witnessed a considerable drop as compared to 1998. The number dropped from 1,980 to 1,714 orphans. This is due to the policy of child re-integration in their household adopted by the Ministry of Social Affairs."

Former Soviet Union

In the post-Soviet countries, orphanages are better known as "children's homes". After reaching school age, all children enroll at internats (boarding schools).

Russia 

In 2021 it was recorded that there were 406,138 orphans living in orphan homes and families in Russia. UNICEF estimates that 95% of these children are "social orphans", meaning that they have at least one living parent who has given them up to the state. In 2011 Russian authorities registered 88,522 children who became orphans that year (down from 114,715 in 2009).

There are few webpages for Russian orphanages in English.
"Of a total of more than 600,000 children classified as being 'without parental care' (most of them live with other relatives and fosters), as many as one-third reside in institutions."

In 2011, there were 1344 institutions for orphans in Russia, including 1094 orphanages ("children's homes") and 207 special ("corrective") orphanages for children with serious health issues.

Azerbaijan 
It is estimated that more than 10,000 children are living in 44 orphanages. In general, "many children are abandoned due to extreme poverty and harsh living conditions. Some may be raised by family members or neighbors but the majority live in crowded orphanages until the age of fifteen when they are sent into the community to make a living for themselves."

Belarus 
Approximate total – 1,773 (1993 statistics for "all types of orphanages")

Kyrgyzstan 

Partial information: 85 – Ivanovka Orphanage

Tajikistan 
There are 4 orphanages in the major cities and 64 boarding schools in Tajikistan, where 8275 children are being educated. Those four orphanages raise 185 children up to 3 years old. In total there are 160 orphans. This small number is likely due to the popularity of adopting.

Ukraine 

100,000 Of this number about 80 percent are described as "social orphans", because the parents are either too poor, abusive, or too addicted to drugs or alcohol to raise them. Due to a lack of funding and overcrowding the conditions at these orphanages are often poor, especially for disabled children.

Since 2012 the number of children adopted by foreigners has gradually been reducing. From about two thousand in 2012 to about two hundred in 2016. A bit more than a thousand children were adopted by Ukrainians in 2016. During 2019 1,419 children were adopted. In 2020 2,047 children were adopted, in 1,890 cases the adoption was carried out by citizens of Ukraine.

Other information:
 thousands – Zaporizhzhia Oblast.
 150 – Kyiv State Baby Orphanage
 30 – Beregena Orphanage
 120 – Dom Invalid Orphanage

Uzbekistan 
Partial Information: 80 – Takhtakupar Orphanage

Oceania

Australia 
Orphanages in Australia mostly closed after World War II and up to the 1970s. Instead, children are mainly put in either Kinship, Residential or Foster care. Notable former orphanages include the Melbourne Orphanage and the St. John's Orphanage in Goulburn, New South Wales.

Indonesia 
No verifiable information for the number of children actually in orphanages. The number of orphaned and abandoned children is approximately 500,000.

Fiji 
Orphans, children (0–17 years) orphaned due to all causes, 2005, estimate 25,000

North America and Caribbean

Haiti
Haitians and expatriate childcare professionals are careful to make it clear that Haitian orphanages and children's homes are not orphanages in the North American sense, but instead shelters for vulnerable children, often housing children whose parent(s) are poor as well as those who are abandoned, neglected or abused by family guardians. Neither the number of children or the number of institutions is officially known, but Chambre de L'Enfance Necessiteusse Haitienne (CENH) indicated that it has received requests for assistance from nearly 200 orphanages from around the country for more than 200,000 children. Although not all are orphans, many are vulnerable or originate in vulnerable families that "hoped to increase their children's opportunities by sending them to orphanages. Catholic Relief Services provides assistance to 120 orphanages with 9,000 children in the Ouest, Sud, Sud-Est and Grand'Anse, but these include only orphanages that meet their criteria. They estimate receiving ten requests per week for assistance from additional orphanages and children's homes, but some of these are repeat requests."

In 2007, UNICEF estimated there were 380,000 orphans in Haiti, which has a population of just over 9 million, according to the CIA World Factbook. However, since the January 2010 earthquake, the number of orphans has skyrocketed, and the living conditions for orphans have seriously deteriorated. Official numbers are hard to find due to the general state of chaos in the country.

Jamaica 
A large amount of children on the island of Jamaica grow up without a parental relationship as a result of their parents' death. An example of places for these lone children to go to are SOS children's villages, The Maxfield Park Children's Home and the Missionaries of the Poor facilities.

Mexico 
There are over 700 public and privates orphanages in Mexico which house over 30,000 children. In 2018 it was estimated that 400,000 children lacked parents. Of these 100,000 are thought to be homeless.

Some notable orphanages include:
 Casa Hogar Jeruel Orphanage in Chihuahua City, Mexico
 Casa Hogar Alegría

United States

While the term "orphanage" is no longer typically used in the United States, nearly every US state continues to operate residential group homes for children in need of a safe place to live and in which to be supported in their educational and life-skills pursuits. Homes like the Milton Hershey School in Pennsylvania, Mooseheart in Illinois and the Crossnore School and Children's Home in North Carolina continue to provide care and support for children in need. While a place like the Milton Hershey School houses nearly 2,000 children, each child lives in a small group-home environment with "house parents" who often live many years in that home. Children who grow up in these residential homes have higher rates of high school and college graduation than those who spend equivalent numbers of years in the US Foster Care system, wherein only 44 to 66 percent of children graduate from high school.

Some private orphanages still exist in the United States apart from governmental child protective services processes. Following World War II, most orphanages in the U.S. began closing or converting to boarding schools or different kinds of group homes. Also, the term "children's home" became more common for those still existing. Over the past few decades, orphanages in the U.S. have been replaced with smaller institutions that try to provide a group home or boarding school environment. Most children who would have been in orphanages are in these residential treatment centers (RTC), residential child care communities, or with foster families. Adopting from RTCs, group homes, or foster families does not require working with an adoption agency, and in many areas, fostering to adopt is highly encouraged.

Central and South America

Guatemala
"...currently there are about 200,000 children in orphanages."

Peru
It is estimated that 550,000 children grow up without parents in Peru. Many of the children in orphanages are considered “social orphans”.

Significant charities that help orphans 
Prior to the establishment of state care for orphans in First World countries, private charities existed to take care of destitute orphans, over time other charities have found other ways to care for children.
 The Orphaned Starfish Foundation is a non-profit organisation based in New York City that focuses on developing vocational schools for orphans, victims of abuse and at-risk youth. It runs fifty computer centers in twenty-five countries, serving over 10,000 children worldwide 
 Lumos works to replace institutions with community-based services that provide children with access to health, education, and social care tailored to their individual needs.
 Hope and Homes for Children are working with governments to deinstitutionalize their child care systems.
 Stockwell Home and later Birchington, started by Charles H Spurgeon, is now Spurgeons after the last orphanage closed in 1979.  Spurgeons Children's Charity provides support to vulnerable and disadvantaged children and families across England. 
 SOS Children's Villages is the world's largest non-governmental, non-denominational child welfare organization that provides loving family homes for orphaned and abandoned children.
 Dr. Barnardo's Homes are now simply Barnardo's after closing their last orphanage in 1989.
 OAfrica, previously OrphanAid Africa, has been working in Ghana since 2002, to get children out of orphanages and into families, in partnership with the government and as the only private implementing partner of the National Plan of Action.
 Joint Council on International Children's Services is a nonprofit child advocacy organization based in Alexandria, Virginia. It is the largest association of international adoption agencies in America, and in addition to working in 51 countries, advocates for ethical practices in American adoption agencies

See also 

 Adoption
 Boys Town (organization)
 Child abandonment
 Child abuse
 Child and family services
 Child and youth care
 Community-based care
 Congregate Care
 Cottage Homes
 Deinstitutionalisation
 Family support
 Florida Sheriffs Youth Ranches
 Foster Care
 Foster Care in the United States
 Group home
 Hope and Homes for Children
 Janusz Korczak
 Kinship Care
 Orphan Train
 Residential Care
 Residential Child Care Communities
 Residential education
 Residential treatment center
 Settlement movement
 Teaching-family model
 The Steele home Orphanage
 Wraparound (childcare)
 Whole Child International

References

External links 

 Keeping Children Out of Harmful Institutions: Why we should be investing in family-based care
 

 
Child welfare
Total institutions